The North Toe River is the headwaters of the Nolichucky River and a tributary in the French Broad River basin. From its source at Sugar Gap, between Bald  Mountain and Sugar Mountain, it flows  westerly through Avery, Mitchell, and Yancey counties.

History
The earliest inhabitants in the Toe River valley area were both the Catawba and Cherokee Indians; though neither lived in the area permanently, it is believed both tribes used the area as a hunting ground. In 1540, the first European to the area was the Spanish explorer Hernando de Soto. Evidence of his visit includes Spanish mining at the Sink Hole, Clarissa, and Horse Stomp mines in Mitchell County. In the late 1560s, Spanish explorer Juan Pardo also visited the area in an attempt to establish a land route to Zacatecas in present-day Mexico. In the 18th century, English, Scotch-Irish, and German settlers came to the area.

Legend of Estatoe
The name Toe is taken from its original name Estatoe, pronounced 'S - ta - toe', a native American name associated with the Estatoe trade route leading down from the North Carolina mountains through Brevard.  There is a historical plaque in Brevard with information that affirms the route, which continues into Pendleton District (now Pickens County), South Carolina, where a village of the same name was located. Due to difficulty in pronouncing the name it was shortened over the years to Toe. 

According to Cherokee Indian legend, the name is derived from a Indian chief's daughter, named Estatoe (pronounced 'S - ta - toe'), who fell in love with a warrior of a rival tribe. Because their love could never be accepted by either's families, they jumped from a precipice into the depths of a nearby river. In an alternative version, their love caused a bloody war between the tribes and Estatoe crafted a peace pipe with two stems in which both chiefs could smoke at once. The two rival chiefs assembled their respective followers on the bank of the river, and smoked till peace was concluded and Estatoe married her lover.

Pollution
With Spruce Pine being the dividing line, the river upstream is considered in good health with a few tributaries impacted related to agricultural and development runoff. Downstream, the river has been impacted by legal and illegal wastewater discharges from mining operations in the area. In 2018, Quartz Corp. illegally discharged hundreds of gallons of hydrofluoric acid into the North Toe River causing a fish kill.

See also
List of North Carolina rivers

References

Tributaries of the French Broad River
Rivers of North Carolina
Rivers of Avery County, North Carolina
Rivers of Mitchell County, North Carolina
Rivers of Yancey County, North Carolina